Adi Salaseini Kavunono Uluivuda Iloilo (1952 – 20 July 2020), popularly known as Adi Kavu, was the First Lady of Fiji. She was the fourth wife of the Josefa Iloilo, who was Fiji's President from 2000 to 2009.

Personal life
Kavunono was born in 1952 and hailed from the chiefly village of Somosomo on the island of Taveuni.

In September 2005, it was reported that Kavunono nabbed an intruder after discovering him in a room of her official residence. Her husband predeceased her in 2011. Kavunono Iloilo died in July 2020 at the age of 68.

References

1952 births
2020 deaths
Ai Sokula
First ladies of Fiji
Fijian chiefs
Politicians from Taveuni